S. indicus may refer to:
 Sanajeh indicus, an extinct species of madtsoiid snake
 Scaposodus indicus, a species of longhorn beetle
 Scomber indicus, the Indian chub mackerel, a species of mackerel
 Sessiluncus indicus, a species of mite
 Simolestes indicus, an extinct pliosaurid species
 Sisyphus indicus, a species of dung beetle
 Sivapithecus indicus, a fossil primate species
 Sphaeranthus indicus, a species of flowering plant
 Sphenomorphus indicus, a species of skink
 Sporobolus indicus, smut grass, a species of grass
 Streptomyces indicus, a species of deep-sea bacterium
 Stolephorus indicus, the Indian anchovy, a species of ray-finned fish
 Symphylurinus indicus, a species of diplurans
 Synodus indicus, the Indian lizardfish, a species of bottom-dwelling fish
 Sypheotides indicus, the lesser florican, a species of terrestrial bird

Synonyms

 Sauropus indicus, a synonym for Sauropus androgynus, the star gooseberry
 Scytaster indicus, a synonym for Fromia indica, the Indian sea star
 Stellio indicus, a synonym for Laudakia tuberculata, a lizard species
 Struthio indicus, a synonym for Struthio asiaticus, the extinct Asian ostrich

See also
 Indicus (disambiguation)